WSLD (104.5 FM) is a radio station  broadcasting a country music format. Licensed to Whitewater, Wisconsin, United States, the station serves Walworth, Jefferson and Rock counties. The station is owned by Nora Karbash, through licensee CMC Media LLC.

References

External links

SLD
Country radio stations in the United States
Radio stations established in 1992
1992 establishments in Wisconsin